Per Elis Albert Nilsson (January 4, 1890 – June 18, 1964) was a Swedish gymnast who competed in the 1912 Summer Olympics. He was part of the Swedish team, which won the gold medal in the gymnastics men's team, Swedish system event.

References

External links
profile

1890 births
1964 deaths
Swedish male artistic gymnasts
Gymnasts at the 1912 Summer Olympics
Olympic gymnasts of Sweden
Olympic gold medalists for Sweden
Olympic medalists in gymnastics
Medalists at the 1912 Summer Olympics